"Get It Right" is a soulful boogie song written by Luther Vandross and Marcus Miller which was an R&B hit for Aretha Franklin in 1983.  Released from the album of the same title, it reached number one on the Hot Soul Singles chart in August 1983 and peaked at number 61 on the Billboard Hot 100. The single reached number nine on the Hot Dance Club Play chart and number 74 on the UK Singles Chart.

Personnel
Aretha Franklin - vocals
Doc Powell, Georg Wadenius - guitar
Marcus Miller - bass, synthesizer
Nat Adderley, Jr. - keyboards
Yogi Horton - drums
Paulinho da Costa - percussion
Steve Kroon - congas, triangle
Dave Friedman - vibraphone
Luther Vandross, Brenda White King, Fonzi Thornton, Michelle Cobbs, Phillip Ballou, Tawatha Agee, Yvonne Lewis - backing vocals

References

Aretha Franklin songs
1983 songs
1983 singles
Songs written by Luther Vandross
Songs written by Marcus Miller
Arista Records singles
Boogie songs
Post-disco songs

it:Get It Right